Doc Walker is the fourth studio album by Canadian country music group Doc Walker. The album was named Album of the Year in 2007 by the Canadian Country Music Association, and was also nominated for Country Recording of the Year at the 2007 Juno Awards.

Track listing

 "Maria" (Mike Daly, Stephen Kellogg and the Sixers) - 3:44
 "Trying To Get Back To You" (Brad Crisler, John Paul White) - 4:17
 "My Life" (Catt Gravitt, Gerald O'Brien, Pamela Rose) - 4:23
 "What Do You See" (Chris Thorsteinson, Bruce Wallace, Dave Wasyliw) - 3:21
 "That Train" (Chris Thorsteinson, Dave Wasyliw, Stacy Wideltz) - 4:26
 "I'm Just Gone" (Chris Thorsteinson, Rodney Clawson, Dave Wasyliw) - 3:25
 "Driving With The Brakes On" (Justin Currie) - 4:00
 "Keri" (Chris Thorsteinson, Bruce Wallace, Dave Wasyliw) - 3:33
 "She's My Remedy" (Ashley Gorley, Chris Thorsteinson, Dave Wasyliw) - 3:52
 "Comes A Time" (Neil Young) - 2:58
 "This Is My Life" (And I'm Alright) (Chris Thorsteinson, Dave Wasyliw) - 2:55
 "Your Mama Don't Know" (Randy Bachman, Chris Thorsteinson, Dave Wasyliw) - 3:19

Personnel 

Drew Bollman – Engineer
Eric Darken – Percussion
Jim DeMain – Mastering
Dan Dugmore – Pedal Steel
John Hobbs – Keyboards
Chip Matthews – Mixing
Justin Niebank – Producer, Engineer
Russ Pahl – Pedal Steel
Murray Pulver – Banjo, Guitar, Vocals, Group Member
Chriss Sutherland – Percussion, Drums, Group Member
Brian David Willis – Digital Editing

2006 albums
Doc Walker albums
Open Road Recordings albums
Canadian Country Music Association Album of the Year albums